Leptospermum nitidum, commonly known as shiny tea-tree, is a species of compact shrub that is endemic to Tasmania.

Description
There are golden brown bracts and bracteoles at the base of the flower buds but that usually fall off before the flower opens.

Taxonomy and naming
Leptospermum nitidum was first formally described in 1856 by English botanist Joseph Dalton Hooker in The Botany of the Antarctic voyage of H.M. Discovery ships Erebus and Terror. III. Flora Tasmaniae based on specimens collected by Ronald Gunn. The specific epithet (nitidum) is a Latin word meaning "shining" or "bright".

Distribution and habitat
Shiny tea-tree grows in cold, moist, heath and is widespread in Tasmania, including on Cape Barren Island.

References

nitidum
Myrtales of Australia
Flora of Tasmania
Plants described in 1856